Chris Rae (born 20 July 1980) is an Australian former weightlifter. He competed in the men's super heavyweight event at the 2000 Summer Olympics.

References

External links
 

1980 births
Living people
Australian male weightlifters
Olympic weightlifters of Australia
Weightlifters at the 2000 Summer Olympics
Sportspeople from Adelaide
Commonwealth Games medallists in weightlifting
Commonwealth Games gold medallists for Australia
Commonwealth Games silver medallists for Australia
Commonwealth Games bronze medallists for Australia
Weightlifters at the 1998 Commonwealth Games
Weightlifters at the 2002 Commonwealth Games
Weightlifters at the 2006 Commonwealth Games
20th-century Australian people
21st-century Australian people
Medallists at the 1998 Commonwealth Games
Medallists at the 2002 Commonwealth Games
Medallists at the 2006 Commonwealth Games